Slavkovce is a village and municipality in Michalovce District in the Kosice Region of eastern Slovakia.

History
In historical records the village was first mentioned in 1315.

Geography
The village lies at an altitude of 103 metres and covers an area of 9.182 km².
It has a population of 610 people.

Ethnicity
The population is about 85% Slovak, 8% Ukrainian and 7% Gypsy in ethnicity.

Culture
The village has a small public library, and a football pitch.

Economy
The village has a food store.

The nearest railway station is at Budkovce 3 kilometres away.
The municipality has a total of 144 houses.

External links
http://www.statistics.sk/mosmis/eng/run.html

Villages and municipalities in Michalovce District